Mammarenavirus is a genus of viruses in the family Arenaviridae. The name is a portmanteau of mammal and the former name Arenavirus, and differentiates it from the reptile-associated Reptarenavirus.  Arenavirus comes from the Latin  (sand) for the sandy appearance of the virions.

Taxonomy
The following species are recognized:

 Allpahuayo mammarenavirus
 Alxa mammarenavirus
 Argentinian mammarenavirus
 Bear Canyon mammarenavirus
 Brazilian mammarenavirus
 Cali mammarenavirus
 Chapare mammarenavirus
 Chevrier mammarenavirus
 Cupixi mammarenavirus
 Flexal mammarenavirus
 Gairo mammarenavirus
 Guanarito mammarenavirus
 Ippy mammarenavirus
 Kitale mammarenavirus
 Lassa mammarenavirus
 Latino mammarenavirus
 Loei River mammarenavirus
 Lujo mammarenavirus
 Luna mammarenavirus
 Lunk mammarenavirus
 Lymphocytic choriomeningitis mammarenavirus
 Machupo mammarenavirus
 Mariental mammarenavirus
 Merino Walk mammarenavirus
 Mobala mammarenavirus
 Mopeia mammarenavirus
 Okahandja mammarenavirus
 Oliveros mammarenavirus
 Paraguayan mammarenavirus
 Pirital mammarenavirus
 Planalto mammarenavirus
 Ryukyu mammarenavirus
 Serra do Navio mammarenavirus 
 Solwezi mammarenavirus
 Souris mammarenavirus
 Tacaribe mammarenavirus
 Tamiami mammarenavirus
 Wenzhou mammarenavirus
 Whitewater Arroyo mammarenavirus
 Xapuri mammarenavirus

References

External links
 ICTV Report: Arenaviridae

Virus genera
Arenaviridae